Publius Terentius Afer (– ), better known in English as Terence, was a Roman African playwright during the Roman Republic. His comedies were performed for the first time around 166–160 BC. Terentius Lucanus, a Roman senator, brought Terence to Rome as a slave, educated him and later on, impressed by his abilities, freed him. It is thought that Terence abruptly died, around the age of 25, likely in Greece or on his way back to Rome, due to shipwreck or disease. He was supposedly on his way to explore and find inspiration for his comedies. His plays were heavily used to learn to speak and write in Latin during the Middle Ages and Renaissance Period, and in some instances were imitated by William Shakespeare.

One famous quotation by Terence reads: "Homo sum, humani nihil a me alienum puto", or "I am human, and I think nothing human is alien to me."  This appeared in his play Heauton Timorumenos.

Biography 

Terence's date of birth is disputed; Aelius Donatus, in his incomplete Commentum Terenti, considers the year 185 BC to be the year Terentius was born; Fenestella, on the other hand, states that he was born ten years earlier, in 195 BC. Other scholars have also stated his birth to be in the year 190 BC. While no one knows for certain, it is likely that it occurred somewhere between the years of 195 BC and 185 BC.

Terence may have been born in or near Carthage or in Greek Italy to a woman taken to Carthage as a slave. Terence's cognomen Afer suggests he lived in the territory of the Libyan tribe called by the Romans Afri near Carthage prior to being brought to Rome as a slave.  

However, it is possible that ancient biographers' reports that Terence was born in Africa are an inference from his name and not independent biographical information. This inference is based on the fact that the term was used in two different ways during the republican era. During Terence's lifetime, it was used to refer to non-Carthaginian Berbers, with the term Punicus reserved for the Carthaginians. Subsequently, after the destruction of Carthage in 146 BC, it was used to refer to anyone from the land of the Afri (that is, the ancient Roman province of Africa, mostly corresponding to today's Tunisia and its surroundings). The cognomen Afer "[North] African" may indicate that Terence hailed from ancient Libya, and was therefore of Berber descent. However, such names did not necessarily denote origin, and there were Romans who had this cognomen who were not Africans, such as Domitius Afer. Consequently, it is not known with certainty whether Terence was given the cognomen Afer as denoting his origin, or if it was solely based on later bibliographers' reports based on the terminology of their day.

According to his traditional biography, he was sold to P. Terentius Lucanus, a Roman senator, who educated him and later on, impressed by Terence's abilities, freed him. Terence then took the nomen "Terentius," which is the origin of the present form.

Based on the writings of the Roman historian Suetonius, Terence was described to be of "moderate height, slender, and of dark complexion," additionally leaving a daughter who subsequently went on to marry a Roman knight. Additionally, Terence was a member of the so-called Scipionic Circle.

When he was about the age of 25, Terence travelled to Greece to gather materials for his plays and never returned. It is mostly believed that Terence died during the journey, but this cannot be confirmed. Before his disappearance, he exhibited six comedies which are still in existence. According to some ancient writers, he died at sea due to shipwreck or disease. It is possible, however, that the fateful voyage to Greece was a speculative explanation of why he wrote so few plays inferred from Terence's complaint in Eunuchus 41–3 about the limited materials at his disposal.

Plays 

Like Plautus, Terence adapted Greek plays from the late phases of Attic comedy. Unlike Plautus though, Terence's way of writing his comedies was more in a simple conversational Latin, pleasant and direct, while less visually humorous to watch.

Five of Terence's plays are about a pair of young men in love (in the Hecyra there is only one young man, who is already married, but who suspects his wife of infidelity). In all the plays there are two girls involved, one respectable, the other a prostitute. In four of the plays a recognition (anagnorisis or anagnorismos) occurs which proves that one of the girls is the long-lost daughter of a respectable citizen, thus making the way free for her marriage.

Aelius Donatus, Jerome's teacher, is the earliest surviving commentator on Terence's work.

Terence's six plays are:
 Andria (The Girl from Andros) (166 BC)
A young Athenian, Pamphilus, is desperately in love with Glycerium, a foreign girl of low class, and has made her pregnant. But his father Simo wants him to marry the daughter of his friend Chremes. Meanwhile his friend Charinus is in love with the daughter that Pamphilus rejects. The wily slave Davus advises Pamphilus to agree to the marriage, believing that Chremes will object to it because of his affair with Glycerium, but the plan goes wrong when Chremes agrees to the marriage after all. Pamphilus is furious with Davus. Simo is also furious since he believes that birth of Glycerium's baby is just one of Davus's tricks. The situation is saved when, thanks to the arrival of a stranger from Andros, Chremes realises that Glycerium is his own long-lost daughter. The two young men get to marry the girls of their choice and Davus is rescued from punishment.

 Hecyra (The Mother-in-Law) (165 BC, but eventually performed in 160 BC)
Laches' son, Pamphilus, has been made to marry Philumena, daughter of their neighbour Phidippus. At first he refused to sleep with her, because of his love for a courtesan, Bacchis, but gradually he grows to love his wife. But while he is away Philumena leaves their home and moves back to her father's house. Everyone blames the mother-in-law, Sostrata, or else his continuing love for Bacchis. But when Pamphilus returns he discovers that the real reason for her departure is that she is about to give birth to a child, which he believes is not his. He therefore decides to divorce Philumena even though he still loves her. The situation is resolved when Philumena's mother Myrrina discovers through a ring which Pamphilus had given to Bacchis that Pamphilus himself was the person who raped her. The gossipy slave Parmeno and the two fathers are kept in the dark about the rape.

 Heauton Timorumenos (The Self-Tormentor) (163 BC)
An Athenian farmer, Chremes, asks his neighbour Menedemus why he works all day on his farm. Menedemus says he is punishing himself for allowing his anger over his son Clinia's love affair with a poor girl to push the boy into going abroad on military service; he misses him terribly. On returning home Chremes finds that Clinia has returned and is visiting Chremes' son Clitipho. Chremes' wily slave Syrus brings Clinia's girlfriend Antiphila to Chremes' house; but he also brings Clitipho's girlfriend, the expensive courtesan Bacchis. To conceal Clitipho's affair, he says they will pretend to Chremes that Bacchis is Clinia's girlfriend, and that Antiphila is one of Bacchis's servants. In another ruse he suggests to Chremes that Chremes should persuade Menedemus to buy Antiphila so that Clinia can stay with Bacchis. However, when Clitipho's mother discovers from a ring that Antiphila is her own daughter, whom Chremes had ordered to be exposed as a baby, this plan falls through. Undeterred, Syrus tricks Chremes into paying money to Bacchis for Antiphila's release. But when Chremes learns that it is Clitipho who is in love with Bacchis, he is furious, especially at the thought of how much Bacchis will cost. At first threatens to disinherit Clitipho, but eventually he forgives him on condition that he agrees to marry a suitable girl at once. Clinia, meanwhile, is allowed to marry Antiphila. Syrus is also forgiven.

 Eunuchus (The Eunuch) (161 BC)
A young man, Phaedria, is in love with a courtesan, Thais. He reluctantly agrees to leave town for a couple of days so that Thais can spend time with a rival lover, Thraso, who has promised to give her a certain slave girl who had previously been in her family. Before leaving town, Phaedria gives Thais an African maid and a eunuch. But while he is absent his 16-year-old brother Chaerea, at the suggestion of the slave Parmeno, disguises himself as the eunuch, gains access to Thais's house, and rapes the young girl, who is actually an Athenian citizen kidnapped in childhood. Thais's plans to restore the girl to her family are ruined. The situation is resolved when Chaerea begs Thais for forgiveness and offers to marry the girl himself. Phaedria gets to continue his affair with Thais, but is persuaded to share her with Thraso, who is richer than he is and can defray the expense of her upkeep. Parmeno, despite the gleeful predictions of Thais's maid Pythias, in the end escapes punishment.

 Phormio (161 BC)
While their fathers are away Antipho has fallen in love with a poor orphaned citizen, and his cousin Phaedria has fallen for a slave girl. Phormio, a parasite, has helped Antipho to marry the poor girl by making a false claim in court. When Antipho's father Demipho returns he is furious because he had wanted Antipho to marry his brother Chremes's daughter. Chremes agrees to pay Phormio 30 minae on condition that he removes the girl and marries her himself. Too late Chremes realises that the poor girl is his own daughter. He tries to undo the arrangement with Phormio, but Phormio has already paid the money to Phaedria to buy his slave girl. Phormio escapes punishment since Chremes' wealthy wife Nausistrata is furious not only about Chremes' secret second marriage but that he had been embezzling her money to pay for it. Antipho is allowed to keep his wife, Phaedria to keep his girlfriend, and Phormio is invited to dinner.

 Adelphoe (The Brothers) (160 BC)
Micio, a wealthy Athenian bachelor, has brought up Aeschinus, the adopted elder son of his brother Demea, in town in an indulgent way. Meanwhile Demea has brought up his younger son Ctesipho in the village in a strict fashion. When Ctesipho falls in love with a slave-girl, Aeschinus on his behalf abducts the girl from the slave-dealer, Sannio, who owns her. Meanwhile, however, the widowed neighbour, Sostrata, alarmed that Aeschinus seems to have abandoned her daughter whom Aeschinus had made pregnant, sends her relative Hegio to complain to Micio, to Aeschinus's embarrassment. A rascally slave, Syrus, plays his part by negotiating with the slave-dealer, and by keeping Demea out of the way of Ctesipho by various ruses. When Demea at last finds Ctesipho and his girlfriend in Micio's house, he is furious and reproaches Micio for interfering in Ctesipho's upbringing. The situation is resolved when Demea takes control. Changing from strictness to indulgence, he suggests that they should forego Aeschinus's wedding procession and simply knock down the dividing wall between the two houses; in addition he insists that Micio must marry Sostrata, give Syrus his freedom and some business capital, and grant Hegio an income from part of his land. Ctesipho is allowed to keep his music-girl.

The first printed edition of Terence appeared in Strasbourg in 1470, while the first certain post-antique performance of one of Terence's plays, Andria, took place in Florence in 1476. There is evidence, however, that Terence was performed much earlier. The short dialogue Terentius et delusor was probably written to be performed as an introduction to a Terentian performance in the 9th century (possibly earlier).

Manuscripts of Terence
The manuscripts of Terence can be divided into two main groups. One group has just one representative, the codex Bembinus (known as A), dating to the 4th or early 5th century AD, and kept in the Vatican library. This book, written in capital letters, is one of the earliest surviving manuscripts of any Latin writer. It has the plays in the order An., Eu., Hau., Ph., Hec., Ad.

The second group, known as the "Calliopian" (since they seem to have been edited at some time by a certain Calliopus) all date from the 9th century onwards and are written in minuscule letters. This group can be subdivided into three classes. The first class, known as γ (gamma), dates to the 9th, 10th, and 11th centuries and includes manuscripts P (Parisinus), C (Vaticanus), and possibly F (Ambrosianus), and E (Riccardianus) among others. They have the plays in the order An., Eu., Hau., Ad., Hec., Ph.. Manuscript C is the famous Codex Vaticanus Latinus 3868, which has illustrations which seem to be copied from originals dating in style to the mid-third century.

Another group, known as δ (delta), has the plays in alphabetical order: An., Ad., Eu., Ph.(=F), Hau., Hec. This consists of 3 or 4 10th-century manuscripts: D (Victorianus), G (Decurtatus), p (Parisinus), and perhaps also L (Lipsiensis).

All the remaining manuscripts belong to the "mixed" group and contain readings copied from both γ and δ, and so are of little value in establishing the text.

It is thought that the γ group and the δ group go back to two archetypes, both now lost, called Γ (Gamma) and Δ (Delta), and that both of these were copied from a single archetype, also now lost, known as Σ (sigma). According to A. J. Brothers, manuscript A, although it contains some errors, generally has a better text than Σ, which has a number of changes designed perhaps to make Terence easier to read in schools. Both A and the now lost Σ are believed to be derived from an even earlier archetype known as Φ (phi), the date of which is unknown.

In addition to these manuscripts there are also certain commentaries, glossaries, and quotations in ancient writers and grammarians which sometimes assist editors in establishing the original reading.

Cultural legacy

Due to his clear and entertaining language, Terence's works were heavily used by monasteries and convents during the Middle Ages and the Renaissance. Although Terence's plays often dealt with pagan material, the quality of his language promoted the copying and preserving of his text by the church. Terence's popularity throughout the Middle Ages and the Renaissance is attested to by the numerous manuscripts containing part or all of his plays; the scholar Claudia Villa has estimated that no fewer than 650 manuscripts containing Terence's work exist, dating from after AD 800. Priests and nuns often learned to speak Latin through reenactment of Terence's plays. The 10th-century German playwright Hroswitha of Gandersheim claims to have written her plays so that learned men had a Christian alternative to reading the pagan plays of Terence.

Pietro Alighieri states that his father Dante took the title of his famous "Divine Comedy" from Terence's plays and in the 14th century Giovanni Boccaccio copied out in his own hand all of Terence's Comedies in manuscripts that are now in the Laurentian Library. The 16th-century reformer Martin Luther not only quoted Terence frequently to tap into his insights into all things human but also recommended his comedies for the instruction of children in school.

The preservation of Terence through the church enabled his work to influence much of later Western drama. Two of the earliest English comedies, the 16th-century Ralph Roister Doister and Gammer Gurton's Needle, are thought to parody Terence's plays. Montaigne, Shakespeare and Molière cite and imitate him.

Terence's plays were a standard part of the Latin curriculum of the neoclassical period. President of the United States John Adams once wrote to his son, "Terence is remarkable, for good morals, good taste, and good Latin...His language has simplicity and an elegance that make him proper to be accurately studied as a model." American playwright Thornton Wilder based his novel The Woman of Andros on Terence's Andria.

Due to his cognomen Afer, Terence has long been identified with Africa and heralded as the first poet of the African diaspora by generations of writers, including Juan Latino, Phyllis Wheatley, Alexandre Dumas, Langston Hughes and Maya Angelou. Two of his plays were produced in Denver with black actors.

Questions as to whether Terence received assistance in writing or was not the actual author have been debated over the ages, as described in the 1911 edition of the Encyclopædia Britannica:
[In a prologue to one of his plays, Terence] meets the charge of receiving assistance in the composition of his plays by claiming as a great honour the favour which he enjoyed with those who were the favorites of the Roman people. But the gossip, not discouraged by Terence, lived and throve; it crops up in Cicero and Quintilian, and the ascription of the plays to Scipio had the honour to be accepted by Montaigne and rejected by Diderot.

See also

 Translation
 Metres of Roman comedy
 Codex Vaticanus 3868
 List of slaves
 Roman Africans
 Quod licet Iovi, non licet bovi
 Trochaic septenarius

References

Further reading
 Augoustakis, A. and Ariana Traill eds. (2013). A Companion to Terence. Blackwell Companions to the Ancient World.  Malden/Oxford/Chichester:  Wiley-Blackwell.
 Boyle, A. J., ed. (2004). Special Issue: Rethinking Terence. Ramus 33:1–2.
 Büchner, K. (1974). Das Theater des Terenz. Heidelberg: C. Winter.
 Davis, J. E. (2014). Terence Interrupted: Literary Biography and the Reception of the Terentian Canon. American Journal of Philology 135(3), 387–409.
 Forehand, W. E. (1985). Terence. Boston: Twayne.
 Goldberg, S. M. (1986). Understanding Terence. Princeton: Princeton University Press.
 Karakasis, E. (2005). Terence and the Language of Roman Comedy. Cambridge: Cambridge University Press.
 Papaioannou, S., ed. (2014). Terence and Interpretation. Pierides, 4.   Newcastle upon Tyne:  Cambridge Scholars Publishing.
 Pezzini, G. (2015). Terence and the Verb ‘To Be’ in Latin. Oxford Classical Monographs.   Oxford/New York:  Oxford University Press.
 Sharrock, A. (2009). Reading Roman Comedy: Poetics and Playfulness in Plautus and Terence. W.B. Stanford Memorial Lectures.   Cambridge/New York:  Cambridge University Press.

External links 

 
 The six plays of Terence at The Latin Library (in Latin).
 
 

 At Perseus Digital Library:
 Andria.
 Hecyra.
 Heautontimorumenos.
 The Eunuch.
 Phormio.
 The Brothers.
 15th-century scripts from Hecyra and Eunuchus, Center for Digital Initiatives, University of Vermont Libraries.
 Lewis E 196 Comediae at OPenn
 Terence's works: text, concordances and frequency list (in Latin).
 Donatus: Commentum Terenti, vol 1. Leipzig 1902.
 The Life of Terence, part of Suetonius's De Viris Illustribus, translated by John C. Rolfe.
 P. Terenti comoediae cum scholi Aeli Donati et Eugraphi commentariis, Reinhold Klotz (ed.), Lipsiae, sumptum fecit, E. B. Schwickert, 1838, vol. 1, vol. 2.
 SORGLL:  Terence, Eunuch 232-264 , read in Latin by Matthew Dillon.
 Latin with Laughter: Terence through Time.

2nd-century BC Berber people
2nd-century BC births
150s BC deaths
2nd-century BC Romans
2nd-century BC Latin writers
Ancient Roman comic dramatists
Berber writers
Old Latin-language writers
Republican era slaves and freedmen
Romans from Africa
Terentii
Deaths due to shipwreck at sea